This article is a list of British firefighters killed in the line of duty since 1900. As such, it only lists those firefighters killed or who sustained injuries from which they subsequently died whilst on duty and not those who were off-duty at the time of the event at which they died. It also does not list the 997 firefighters killed during the Second World War, nor any deaths relating to The Troubles in Northern Ireland. Military firefighter personnel are only listed if they died during non-combatant fires or accidents. Some links to the original fire authority areas may link to the present day authority that covers the geographic area.

For example, the West Riding Fire Service became the West Yorkshire Fire Service in 1974, and during this process parts of the former West Riding of Yorkshire area became part of East Yorkshire (Humberside Fire and Rescue Service), Cumbria, Lancashire and Greater Manchester. See History of fire brigades in the United Kingdom

During the period between 1941 and 1947, all fire brigades in Britain were amalgamated into the National Fire Service (NFS). This totalled over 1,600 individual brigades. Some links that point to the NFS may actually link to the fire service that covers the present day geographical area. When the NFS was broken up, it was decided that local county authority control would be the natural way to divide the brigades. This left Essex with one brigade covering the ceremonial county and Southend, which was a county borough, with its own independent fire service.

As more than one firefighter has died at certain incidents, some listings for dead firefighters may refer to the first alphabetical entry from that event. Certain brigades may have been subsumed into other services (Bradford Fire Brigade into West Yorkshire) or completely dissolved altogether, such as the Lancashire & Yorkshire Railway Fire Brigade.

The Firefighter's Prayer

List

Key: W = Wholetime firefighter, R = Retained firefighter, O = Other firefighter staff, T = Trainee

Notes

References

Sources

External links
The Institution of Fire Engineers
Firefighter Deaths
Glasgow Cheapside Fire memorial plaque unveiling video
Firefighter deaths since 1978
WYFS deaths
Kent Fire and Rescue Service roll of Honour
The Firefighters' Heritage Trail in Glasgow

Fire and rescue services of England
Fire and rescue services of the United Kingdom
Fire and rescue services of Scotland
Fire and rescue services of Wales
British firefighters
 
History of firefighting